Hard Days, Hard Nights (known as Beat Boys in West Germany) is a 1989 film.

Plot
A British rock and roll band from Liverpool descends on Hamburg, c. 1960.  They form romantic liaisons with several townspeople.

Cast
 Al Corley as Chris
 Mark Forrest as John
 Nick Moran as Rick
 Tony Forsyth as Alan
 Paul Codman as Skid
 Rita Tushingham as Rita
 Wigald Boning as Kurt
 Christoph Eichhorn as Knies
 Ulrich Mühe as Flimmer
 Helmut Griem as Kronschneider

External links
 

1989 films
1989 drama films
German drama films
West German films
1980s German-language films
The Beatles in film
Films set in Hamburg
Films set in the 1960s
1980s German films